The Bayerbacher Bach or Bayerbach is a stream in Bavaria, Germany. It is a tributary of the Kleine Laber in Lower Bavaria.

Course 

From its source in the Landshut district near Paindlkofen, a district of the municipality Ergoldsbach, the Bayerbacher Bach mostly flows in the north direction. Among others the stream runs through Feuchten, Bayerbach and Greilsberg.

Then it enters the district Straubing-Bogen. Finally it reaches the municipality of Laberweinting. There, near Habelsbach, the Bayerbacher Bach issues into the Kleine Laber.

Tributaries 
 Wildbach (right)
 Mühlbach (right)
 Gerabach (right)
 Stockaer Bach (left)
 Hillbach (right)
 Oberellenbach (left)
 Asbach (right)
 Ellenbach (right)
 Haadersbach (right)

See also 
List of rivers of Bavaria

References

External links 
 Verzeichnis der Bach- und Flussgebiete in Bayern – Flussgebiet Naab bis Isar (PDF; 2,8 MB) p. 70

Rivers of Bavaria
Straubing-Bogen
Rivers of Germany